CS Universitatea Cluj-Napoca is a Romanian women's handball club from Cluj-Napoca, that plays in the Liga Națională.

Kits

Results
Liga Naţională:
Silver: 2010, 2011, 2012
Bronze: 1998, 2007, 2013
Supercupa României :
Finalists: 2013
EHF Challenge Cup:
Finalists: 2007

Players

Current squad 2020-2021

Goalkeepers
 1  Mădălina Ion
 12  Marina Dumanska 
 26  Viorica Țăgean
Wingers
   Andreea Barbos
   Denisa Șelever
   Florența Ilie
   Raluca Nicolae
Line Players
 10  Florina Chintoan (c)
  Ana Maria Dumitrașcu
Back Players
LB
 19  Diana Lazăr  
   Corina Cordoș
  Selena Demian
CB
 17  Rebeca Necula
   Judith Vizuete
RB
   Paulina Masna
  Bianca Lupașcu

Players

Selected former players 
 Carmen Amariei-Lungu
 Cristina Dogaru-Cucuian
 Ionica Munteanu
 Alina Ariton
 Oana Chirilă
 Georgeta Vârtic 
 Simona Vintilă
 Alina Ţurcaş
 Nicoleta Dincă
 Clara Vădineanu
 Cristina Laslo 
 Ionica Munteanu 
 Laura Popa 
 Viktória Petróczi

Selected former coaches 
 Dinu Cojocaru
 Liviu Jurcă
 Gheorghe Covaciu

References

External links
 Official U Jolidon Cluj-Napoca Website 
 

Romanian handball clubs
Liga Națională (women's handball) clubs
Sport in Cluj-Napoca
Handball clubs established in 1968
1968 establishments in Romania